Diva TV was a British TV channel owned by Universal Networks International, which launched on Sky in the UK and Ireland on channel 269 at midday on 1 October 2007.

Despite having quite a varied schedule upon launch, the channel's programming declined. It aired shows such as The Late Show With David Letterman, The Oprah Winfrey Show, The Talk and McLeod's Daughters.

On 1 November 2011 Diva TV +1 closed on Sky channel 277. The channel had previously been available on Virgin Media channel 165 until 1 April 2010.

Diva TV closed on 14 February 2012 at midnight with its most popular programmes shifted to the Style Network. The move followed NBCUniversal's acquisition by Comcast in March 2011 and affected only the UK market.

The Ellen DeGeneres Show
From April 2011, Diva TV no longer aired The Ellen DeGeneres Show. Diva TV have cited being "unable to attract enough viewers to make the show viable for the channel". From 19 September 2011 Really picked up The Ellen DeGeneres Show starting from season 9.

See also
Diva Universal

References

External links
Official Diva TV website

Television channels and stations established in 2007
Television channels in the United Kingdom
Universal Networks International
Defunct television channels in the United Kingdom
Television channels and stations disestablished in 2012